Jimmy R. Newton, Jr. (1978 – March 31, 2014) was the tribal chairman of the Southern Ute Indian Reservation of Colorado.

Newton received his degree in visual graphic designs from Collins College, in Phoenix, Arizona. He served on the tribal council and as vice chairman before his election in 2012 as tribal chairman.

Notes

1978 births
2014 deaths
21st-century Native Americans
Chairmen of the Southern Ute Indian Tribe
20th-century Native Americans